Pranceacanthus is a monotypic genus of flowering plants belonging to the family Acanthaceae. It only contains one known species, Pranceacanthus coccineus Wassh. 

It is native to Bolivia and (northern and west central) Brazil.

The genus name of Pranceacanthus is in honour of Ghillean Prance (b. 1937), a prominent British botanist and ecologist who has published extensively on the taxonomy of families such as Chrysobalanaceae and Lecythidaceae. The Latin specific epithet of coccineus means  scarlet and is derived from coccum.. Both the genus and the species were first described and published in Brittonia Vol.36 on page 1 in 1984.

References

Acanthaceae
Acanthaceae genera
Plants described in 1984
Flora of Bolivia
Flora of North Brazil
Flora of West-Central Brazil